Ganzurino is a rural locality (a station) in Ivolginsky District, Republic of Buryatia, Russia. The population was 149 as of 2010. There are 2 streets.

References 

Rural localities in Ivolginsky District